The Snowdon Race is a ten-mile endurance running competition in Gwynedd, from Llanberis to the peak of Snowdon. Contestants must make the five miles up the Llanberis Path to the summit ( above sea level) and return down. Currently entrants must be over-18 to compete in either the men's or women's race. In 2009 a junior race was incorporated.

The race was first held in 1976 when Ken Jones from Llanberis put forward the idea to the village's Carnival Committee. 86 runners took part in the first race. In 2010, nearly 500 runners competed, with the nations represented including Scotland, Italy and Kenya.

The men's course record stands at 1:02:29, set by Kenny Stuart in 1985. The women's course record stands at 1:12:48, set by Carol Greenwood in 1993.

Radio Cymru broadcasts live from the event, and S4C produces a television highlights programme showing profiles on individual racers.

In 1996, the course was used for the European Mountain Running Trophy, run on the same weekend but separately from the annual Snowdon Race. Jaime Dejesus-Mendes was the winner of the men's race in 1:03:16. The women ran a shorter course, with Isabelle Guillot finishing first in 53:09.

In 2001, the race was part of the World Mountain Running Association Grand Prix.

Results

All Jeska's athletics results were declared null and void when she failed to produce samples of her testosterone levels.

References

Athletics competitions in Wales
Fell running competitions
Mountain running competitions
Skyrunning competitions
Skyrunner World Series
Snowdonia